Persoonia hakeiformis is a species of flowering plant in the family Proteaceae and is endemic to the south-west of Western Australia.

Description

Taxonomy
Persoonia hakeiformis was first formally described in 1856 by Carl Meissner in de Candolle's Prodromus Systematis Naturalis Regni Vegetabilis.

Distribution and habitat
This geebung has been collected at the Boyagin Nature Reserve, Tarin Rock and Newdegate in the south-west of Western Australia, where it grows in heath and woodland.

Conservation status
Persoonia hakeiformis is classified as "Priority Two" by the Western Australian Government Department of Parks and Wildlife meaning that it is poorly known and from only one or a few locations.

References

hakeiformis
Flora of Western Australia
Plants described in 1856
Taxa named by Carl Meissner